The fastest times in the swimming events at the Mediterranean Games are listed by International Mediterranean Games Committee (CIJM) as a list of Mediterranean Games records in swimming. The events are held in a long course (50 m) pool. The list has been updated after the last Games, held in Tarragona, Spain in 2018.

All records were set in finals unless noted otherwise.

Men

Women

References

Swimming at the Mediterranean Games
Mediterranean Games
Swimming